"Shots" is a song by American rock band Imagine Dragons. It was written by band members Ben McKee, Daniel Platzman, Dan Reynolds and Wayne Sermon and released as the third and final single from their second studio album Smoke + Mirrors (2015).

Composition
The song shows influence of industrial music with heavy use of synthesizers. Reynolds' vocals are light, despite the dark lyrical content, recalling music from the 1980s. Sermon's guitar textures add complexity.

Promotion 
Imagine Dragons performed the track during a first ever live commercial (for Target) during the Grammy Awards (2015). The advertising was filmed on Las Vegas' Fremont Street under the direction of Jonas Åkerlund. The advertising promoted an exclusive edition of the album available at Target which includes four bonus tracks. It was estimated to cost $8 million and charted at number 2 on the Billboard Trending 140.

"Shots" was performed on The Tonight Show Starring Jimmy Fallon (February 18, 2015), The Howard Stern Show (March 24, 2015), The Ellen DeGeneres Show (2015), and Today (2015).

Music video
On February 12, 2015, Imagine Dragons released the official music video for "Shots".  The video was directed by Robert Hales and was inspired by the artwork created by San Diego-based painter Tim Cantor. The same artwork also serves as the cover art for all of the singles for the album. Cantor himself appears as the live depiction of one of his paintings.

Track listing

Personnel
Imagine Dragons
Dan Reynolds – lead vocals, percussion, songwriting, production
Wayne Sermon – guitar, songwriting, production
Ben McKee – bass guitar, synthesizers, songwriting, production
Daniel Platzman – drums, percussion, songwriting, production

Broiler remix
In April 2015, Norwegian DJ and electronic music duo Broiler (Mikkel Christiansen and Simen Auke) released a remix of "Shots". It was a hit in its own right on VG-lista, the official Norwegian Singles Chart, reaching number 4 on the chart. A music video for the remix was released about 2 months later, on June 4.

Chart performance

Weekly charts

Broiler Remix

Year-end charts

Certifications

Release history

References

External links

 Imagine Dragons official website

2010s ballads
2015 singles
2014 songs
American new wave songs
American synth-pop songs
Imagine Dragons songs
Kidinakorner singles
Interscope Records singles
Music videos directed by Robert Hales
Rock ballads
Universal Music Group singles
Songs written by Wayne Sermon
Songs written by Dan Reynolds (musician)
Songs written by Daniel Platzman
Songs written by Ben McKee
Synth-pop ballads